Calmar is a monotypic genus of planthopper in the family Fulgoridae, presently comprising a single species Calmar punctata, known from Senegal and Gambia.

References

Auchenorrhyncha genera
Aphaeninae
Monotypic Hemiptera genera
Insects of Africa